Robert Beech-Jones is a Judge of the New South Wales Supreme Court since 2012, the Chief Judge at Common Law and a judge of the New South Wales Court of Appeal since August 2021.
Beech-Jones began practising law in Sydney in the 1980s. He was called to the New South Wales Bar in 1992, joined 11th Floor St James Hall, and was appointed senior counsel in 2006. He primarily practised in the areas of commercial law, regulatory enforcement, white collar crime and administrative law.

Personal life 
Beech-Jones spent his childhood years in Savage River, Tasmania, although with a brief stint in Montreal, Canada. He studied law and science at the Australian National University, graduating with Honours in 1988.  

Beech-Jones is married to Australian playwright Suzie Miller, with whom he has two children. He also has three brothers.

Beech-Jones has a keen interest in Australian Rules Football, marathon running, and mathematics.

References 

Judges of the Supreme Court of New South Wales

Year of birth missing (living people)
Living people
20th-century Australian lawyers
21st-century Australian judges